Anaílson Noleto Brito (Estreito, March 8, 1978) is a Brazilian footballer who plays as attacking midfielder.

Career
Went through several of the national soccer teams, among which we mention Rio Branco, Sao Caetano and Nautical. He also had tickets also for Brazil's under-17. Currently defends Atletico Goianiense.

Club statistics

Honours
 Champion Championship 2004 by the Association Sportive Sao Caetano
 Vice-champion of the Campeonato Brasileiro 2001 by the Sports Association Sao Caetano
 Vice-champion of the Copa Libertadores 2002 Sao Caetano Sports Association
 Cup Champion Athletic Club at 2007 Goiano Goianiense
 Champion Series C 2008 by the Athletic Club Goianiense
 Cup Champion Athletic Club at 2010 Goiano Goianiense

Contract
 Atlético Goianiense.

References

External links

 ogol.com
 wspsoccer
 sambafoot
 globoesporte

1978 births
Living people
Brazilian footballers
Brazilian expatriate footballers
Expatriate footballers in Japan
Associação Desportiva São Caetano players
Marília Atlético Clube players
J2 League players
Tokyo Verdy players
Atlético Clube Goianiense players
Campeonato Brasileiro Série A players

Association football midfielders